Piano Concerto No. 1 in B-flat Minor may refer to:

 Piano Concerto (Atterberg)
 Piano Concerto No. 1 (Scharwenka)
 Piano Concerto No. 1 (Stenhammar)
 Piano Concerto No. 1 (Tchaikovsky)

See also
 List of piano concertos by key